Chonsung station (officially: Jonsung station, translated as 'war victory') is a station on Hyŏksin Line of the Pyongyang Metro.

The station is a short walking distance from the Jonu station, Embassy of the People's Republic of China and Ryomyonggori Cinema.

This station was refurbished in 2020, when Ryomyong Street was constructed. The platform level is now much brighter,  TVs and seats have been added including a revamped exterior building.

References

External links
 

Pyongyang Metro stations
Railway stations opened in 1975
1975 establishments in North Korea